Georgian singer and songwriter Nina Sublatti has released one studio album, one extended play, eight singles, and four music videos.

Albums

Studio albums

Extended plays

Singles

Music videos

References

Pop music discographies
Discographies of artists from Georgia (country)